The following is a list of George Foster Peabody Award winners and honorable mentions from the decade of the 1970s (1970–1979).

1970

1971

1972

1973

1974

1975

1976

1977

1978

1979

References

 List1970